The Danish Brewery, Distillery and Mineral Water Workers' Union (DBBMF) was a trade union representing workers in the beverage industry in Denmark.

The union was founded in 1898, as the Danish Brewery Workers' Union.  It affiliated to the Danish Confederation of Trade Unions (LO), and later, to the International Union of Food and Allied Workers (IUF).  By 1954, it had 8,390 members.  From 1926 until 1962, it was led by Marius Madsen, who became president of the IUF.

In 1990, the union merged with the Danish Hotel and Restaurant Workers' Union and the National Gastronomic Union, to form the Restaurant and Brewery Workers' Union.

References

Food processing trade unions
Trade unions established in 1898
Trade unions disestablished in 1990
Trade unions in Denmark